Andrea Mason is a British actress who played W.P.C. Debbie Keane in The Bill from 1995 to 1998. She has guest starred in Clocking Off, Holby City, William and Mary, Emmerdale and Doctors.

References

External links 
 
 Andrea Mason on Pemberton Associates - Film, Television and Theatrical Agents
 Andrea Mason on Spotlight: The home of casting

British television actresses
British soap opera actresses
1968 births
Living people